Eloy Edu Nkene (born 16 March 1985), simply known as Eloy, is an Equatorial Guinean football player and manager who plays as a defender. He was a member of the Equatorial Guinea national team.

International career
Eloy was called for play with the Equatorial Guinea national team in the Africa Cup of Nations 2008 Qualifying match against Cameroon on 7 October 2006. He was also part of the Equatoguinean team in the Mundialito de la Inmigración y la Solidaridad 2010 in Madrid, Spain.

References

External links
 
 
 
 
 Fútbol Estadística 

1985 births
Living people
People from Ebibeyin
Equatoguinean footballers
Association football central defenders
AD Arganda footballers
CU Collado Villalba players
Tarxien Rainbows F.C. players
St. Andrews F.C. players
Internacional de Madrid players
Tercera División players
Divisiones Regionales de Fútbol players
Maltese Premier League players
Equatorial Guinea international footballers
Equatoguinean emigrants to Spain
Equatoguinean expatriate footballers
Equatoguinean expatriate sportspeople in Malta
Expatriate footballers in Malta
Equatoguinean football managers